Enneacanthus is a genus of freshwater fish in the sunfish family (Centrarchidae) of order Perciformes. The type species is E. obesus, the banded sunfish, and the species of this genus are known collectively as the banded or little sunfishes.

The Enneacanthus species, all of which grow to a maximum overall length of about 10 cm (4 in), are native to freshwater lakes, ponds, and estuaries along the Atlantic and Gulf coasts of the United States.

All three species are kept as aquarium fish by hobbyists.

Etymology 

The generic name Enneacanthus derives from the Greek εννέα (nine) and άκανθα (thorn).

Species
The currently recognized species in this genus are:

References 

 
Centrarchinae
Extant Miocene first appearances